The CZ 85 is a semi-automatic pistol chambered for 9×19mm Parabellum.

It was manufactured in Czechoslovakia (now the Czech Republic) by Česká Zbrojovka. It is an updated version of the CZ 75, with slight changes made to internal parts to increase reliability. It has an ambidextrous safety switch and slide stop, making the pistol suitable for both right- and left-handed shooters. CZ weapons are known for their long service life and high reliability while using various types of cartridges.

The CZ 85 was developed because the CZ 75 had no patents protecting the design, and the CZ 75 was copied in other countries with unlicensed versions.

The CZ 85B is an up-to-date version with a firing pin block safety, squared off trigger guard, a ring hammer, and tri-dot sights.  It is available in 9×19mm and .40 S&W calibers. The 9mm magazines hold 16 rounds and the .40 magazines hold 10.

See also
NZ 85B

References

External links
Ceska Zbrojovka official website
CZ-USA official website

Semi-automatic pistols of Czechoslovakia
9mm Parabellum semi-automatic pistols
.40 S&W semi-automatic pistols